Susan Elizabeth Tracy (1878 - 1928) was an American school administrator, business owner and nurse.  She wrote the first American book on occupational therapy.

Born in 1878 Tracy studied nursing in a Massachusetts hospital.  After finishing her nursing education in 1898, she work as a nurse at Presbyterian Hospital in Chicago. 

In 1905, Tracy returned to school to study economics and art. She became a school administrator at a nursing school. In 1912 Tracy decided to open an occupational therapy practice in which she taught both patients and nurses.   She performed the first systematic studies on occupational therapy. Tracy's first book on disabilities was published in 1910. 

Tracy died in Massachusetts in 1928.

References

1878 births
1928 deaths
Occupational therapists